Ross Robert Lowe  (September 21, 1928 in Oshawa, Ontario – August 8, 1955) was a Canadian professional ice hockey player who played three seasons in the National Hockey League from 1949 to 1952 for the Boston Bruins and Montreal Canadiens.

Lowe scored his first NHL goal on November 15, 1950 as a member of the Boston Bruins in his team's 4-3 win over the New York Rangers at Madison Square Garden.

Lowe played 77 career NHL games, scoring six goals and eight assists for fourteen points. In his last professional season, he played for the Springfield Indians of the American Hockey League and managed to score 82 points in only 60 games, which earned him the Les Cunningham Award as league MVP. Ross signed with the New York Rangers but never made it to training camp as he drowned that off-season in Lake Haliburton while vacationing with his family.

Career statistics

Regular season and playoffs

See also
List of ice hockey players who died during their playing career

References

External links
 

1928 births
1955 deaths
Boston Bruins players
Buffalo Bisons (AHL) players
Canadian ice hockey defencemen
Canadian ice hockey left wingers
Hershey Bears players
Ice hockey people from Ontario
Montreal Canadiens players
Oshawa Generals players
Sportspeople from Oshawa
Springfield Indians players
Vancouver Canucks (WHL) players